Andrzej Kozak (b. 14 September 1934) is a Polish actor. In 1974, he starred in the Academy Award-nominated film The Deluge directed by Jerzy Hoffman.

Selected filmography
 Westerplatte (1967)
 The Deluge (1974)
 Przeklęte oko proroka (1984)

References

1934 births
Living people
Polish male stage actors
Polish male film actors
Male actors from Kraków
20th-century Polish people